Crystal Renee Emery is a filmmaker and founder and CEO of URU The Right To Be, Inc., a nonprofit content production company. She is an If/Then ambassador and was featured in the Smithsonian's "#IfThenSheCan - The Exhibit", a collection of life-sized 3D-printed statues of role models in STEM.

Early life and education 
Emery grew up in the Brookside neighborhood of New Haven. Her interest in filmmaking started from a young age. In the third grade, she started directing plays with her brothers. By fifth grade she wrote and directed her first play about Harriet Tubman's work to free people who were enslaved.  

Emery has a B.A. from the University of Connecticut (1985) and then worked as an apprentice in theater with Lloyd Richards and as a production assistant for Bill Duke. She then moved to New York City and earned an M.A. in media studies from The New School of Public Engagement. In 2018 she received an honorary Doctorate of Letters from the University of Connecticut (2018).

Career 
Emery began directing plays while she was in college. She has directed multiple documentary films including The Deadliest Disease in America and Changing the Face of Medicine. In 2010 she began working on the documentary Black Women in Medicine in which she interviews seven black physicians and combines the interviews with historical videos from the 1950s and 1960s. 

Her written works include Sweet Nez, the play A Way Out of No Way and a book titled Against All Odds, which features 100 prominent Black women medical doctors. She worked on a virtual reality game called You Can't Be What You Can't See which allows players to step into a virtual reality world as a medical professional.

Personal life 
While in college, Emery was diagnosed with Charcot-Marie-Tooth, a degenerative nerve disease and she lives with quadriplegia and diabetes.

References 

Living people

Year of birth missing (living people)
University of Connecticut alumni

American women chief executives

American nonprofit chief executives

The New School alumni
Documentary film directors
American writers